Triodon macropterus (common name the threetooth puffer and the black-spot keeled pufferfish) is a tetraodontiform fish, the only living species in the genus Triodon and family Triodontidae. Other members of the family are known from fossils stretching back to the Eocene. The threetooth puffer was first scientifically described by René Lesson in 1831 and is recognizable for its large belly flap which has the ability to blend into the body when fully retracted.

Etymology 

Distribution and ecology 
Its habitat is pelagic, consisting of continental shelves, slopes, seamounts, and knolls.

Diet and digestion 
Little is known about the diet of the threetooth puffer. However, a dissection of the stomach of a caught juvenile specimen uncovered traces of mysid crustacean, foraminifera, echinoids, and sponges.

The intestinal tract of the threetooth puffer (the esophagus, stomach, and intestines) is lined with several papillae, protrusions of the gut lumen. After the stomach, the tract branches off into a specialized sac-like compartment called Tyler's Pouch. Within the Tyler's Pouch the papillae are much larger in size and number compared to those prior. The role and function of Tyler's Pouch is largely unknown.

Adult characteristics 
Its body is yellowish-brown with a white belly flap as large as or larger than its body which it inflates with seawater when threatened. The flap is inflated by rotating the shaft-like pelvis downwards, exposing a black eye-spot contoured with yellow. This makes the animal appear much larger to predators, and less likely to be eaten. When danger is not present, the flap is retracted seamlessly into the body and the eye-spot is not visible.

The head of an adult threetooth puffer makes up approximately 30.6% of the length of its body, and the eyes make up about 7.5% of its body length. The upper jaw is composed of two dental plates while the teeth on the lower jaw protrude from a single dental plate, resulting in a beak.

The threetooth puffer has ribs, a beak, and no pelvic fins which are all characteristics of tetraodontiformes.

Adult scales have a rhombic base, and each has a median ridge from which several spines protrude.

Juvenile characteristics 
The smallest Triodon macropterus specimen on record measures 20mm long and belongs to the ichthyological section of the Muséum Nationale d'Histoire Naturelle in Paris. The head of the specimen makes up 45% of the length of its body, and its eyes make up 18% of its body length. As a juvenile, the pelvic bone is continuing to develop within the rotund belly.

Juveniles have unicuspid scales, tricuspid scales, and pentacuspid scales.

Danger to humans 
Triodon macropterus is harmless to humans unless eaten, at which point the species is considered poisonous.

See also 

 Tetraodontidae
 Tetraodontiformes
 Ostraciidae
 Triacanthodidae

References

Triodontidae
Fish described in 1831
Monotypic fish genera
Taxa named by René Lesson